Galvin at Windows is a restaurant located on the top floor of the London Hilton on Park Lane restaurant. Launched in May 2006 by Chef Patron Chris Galvin as the second restaurant from the Galvin Brothers, the restaurant was awarded its Michelin Star in 2007 and maintained it until 2020 when they lost the single star.

The restaurant offers seasonally inspired modern French haute cuisine with regularly changing menus which take in a wide range on influences, not least Head Chef Joo Won's Korean heritage, while retaining its focus on classical French techniques. It also offers traditional Sunday lunches and hosts regular wine dinners and tastings which draw on global cuisines and bring experts in the field to the restaurant on a regular basis.

The senior team at Galvin at Windows remained consistent from launch to December 2019, a remarkable feat for a London restaurant.  Original General Manager Fred Sirieix - who is also a writer, broadcaster and charity activist - left in December 2019.  Head Chef Joo still leads the kitchen.

The bar at Galvin at Windows offers a wide range of premium wines, spirits and classic cocktails while also having a seasonally changing menu of special drinks and a light, more relaxed food menu.

The restaurant is known for its panoramic views onto Hyde Park facing west and across central London to the north and south, while the bar looks across central London to the north, east and south.

See also 

 List of French restaurants

References

External links
 Galvin at Windows Website
 Website of Galvin at Windows in hilton.com

French restaurants in London
Michelin Guide starred restaurants in the United Kingdom